Bell Tower is an office tower in Edmonton, Alberta, Canada, designed by Skidmore, Owings & Merrill and completed in 1982. The tower has 31 stories and stands 130 metres (426 ft) tall. It was formerly known as the Canadian Commercial Bank Tower, and was the headquarters of the Canadian Commercial Bank before that bank failed in 1985. Current tenants include Bell Canada, Credit Union Deposit Guarantee Corporation, and Avison Young Real Estate.

See also
List of tallest buildings in Edmonton

External links
Bell Tower
Bell Tower Emporis profile

Office buildings completed in 1982
Bell Canada
Skyscraper office buildings in Canada
Skyscrapers in Edmonton
Towers in Alberta
1982 establishments in Alberta
Skidmore, Owings & Merrill buildings